Coldwell may refer to:

People
 Addy Joaquín Coldwell (born 1939), Mexican politician
 Bill Coldwell (1932–1995), English football manager and scout
 Cec Coldwell (1929–2008), English footballer and team manager
 George R. Coldwell (1858–1924), Canadian politician
 Len Coldwell (1933–1996), English cricketer
 M. J. Coldwell (1888–1974), Canadian politician
 Pattie Coldwell (1952–2002), a British TV presenter and journalist
 Paul Coldwell (born 1952), British artist
 Pedro Joaquín Coldwell (born 1950), Mexican politician
 Robert Coldwell Wood (1923–2005), American administrator
 Terry Coldwell, member of band East 17

Places
 Rural Municipality of Coldwell, Manitoba, Canada

Other uses
 Maggie Coldwell, a character from the TV series Casualty
 Coldwell Complex, an igneous intrusion
 Coldwell Banker, an American real estate franchise

See also
 Caldwell (surname)

English-language surnames